Uwe Adler (born 30 May 1944) is a German modern pentathlete. He competed at the 1964 Summer Olympics for the United Team of Germany.

References

1944 births
Living people
Sportspeople from Halle (Saale)
People from the Province of Saxony
German male modern pentathletes
Olympic modern pentathletes of the United Team of Germany
Modern pentathletes at the 1964 Summer Olympics